Frederic Llewellyn Deane (19 September 1868 - 1952) was the inaugural Provost of St. Mary's Cathedral, Glasgow and then bishop of Aberdeen and Orkney from 1917 to 1943.

Biography
Frederic was born at Stainton le Vale in Lincolnshire on 19 September 1868, the son of Francis Hugh Deane, Rector of Horsington and Stainton, and his wife and 2nd cousin, Emma Anne, the daughter of Robert Micklem Deane of Caversham in Oxfordshire (now Berkshire). Educated at Keble College, Oxford, he had previously been a Curate in Kettering and Vicar of St Andrew, Diocese of Leicester.

References

External links

1868 births
1952 deaths
Doctors of Divinity
Provosts of St Mary's Cathedral, Glasgow
Bishops of Aberdeen and Orkney
People from West Lindsey District